The NSU University School, commonly known as University School or simply U-School, is a fully accredited, independent, college preparatory school in Davie, Florida, that serves grades pre-K through grade 12. The school is located on the Nova Southeastern University (NSU) campus. It is divided into "Lower", "Middle", and "Upper" schools, respectively representing national elementary, middle and high school divisions. In 2015 William J. Kopas became its headmaster, replacing Jerome Chermak who had served in that role for 16 years.

Notable alumni

 Vernon Carey Jr. ('19), NBA pro basketball player Charlotte Hornets 
 Scottie Barnes (class of '20, transferred out for senior season) 2022 NBA Rookie of the Year Award winner
 Tyler Katz ('19), Salem Red Sox play-by-play broadcaster
 Taylor Hendricks (class of '22, transferred out for junior season), basketball player
 Jett Howard (class of '22, transferred out for junior season), basketball player
 Matthew Pearl ('93), novelist and educator
 Scott Weinger ('93), actor best known for the voice of the title character in Aladdin (1992)
 Seth Gabel ('99), actor
 Josh Gad ('99), actor
 Lauren Book ('03), member of the Florida Senate from the 32nd district
 Michael Waller ('04), contemporary classical music and avant-garde composer
 A.J. Steigman ('04), competitive chess player, former investment banker, and CEO of Soletron 
 Daniel Braverman ('12), Kansas City Chiefs wide receiver
 Quincy Wilson ('14), former New York Jets cornerback
 Skai Moore ('13), Indianapolis Colts linebacker
 Mike White ('13), Miami Dolphins quarterback
 Kenny McIntosh ('19), two-time national championship winning running back University of Georgia

References

External links
 University School of NSU

High schools in Broward County, Florida
Nova Southeastern University
Educational institutions established in 1971
Education in Fort Lauderdale, Florida
Private high schools in Florida
Private middle schools in Florida
Private elementary schools in Florida
Preparatory schools in Florida
1971 establishments in Florida